Posada  is a village in the administrative district of Gmina Brójce, within Łódź East County, Łódź Voivodeship, in central Poland.

The village has a population of 40.

References

 Central Statistical Office (GUS) Population: Size and Structure by Administrative Division - (2007-12-31) (in Polish)

Villages in Łódź East County